Ceratinia neso, the Neso tigerwing, is a species of butterfly of the family Nymphalidae. It is found in South America.

The wingspan is 46–50 mm.

Subspecies
 Ceratinia neso neso (Brazil)
 Ceratinia neso espriella (Hewitson, 1868) (Ecuador)
 Ceratinia neso hamlini (Weeks, 1906) (Venezuela)
 Ceratinia neso nisea (Godart, 1819) (Suriname, Guianas)
 Ceratinia neso niselina (Zikán, 1941) (Brazil: Amazonas)
 Ceratinia neso peruensis (Haensch, 1905) (Peru)
 Ceratinia neso tarapotis (Haensch, 1909) (Peru)

References

Butterflies described in 1806
Ithomiini
Fauna of Brazil
Nymphalidae of South America
Taxa named by Jacob Hübner